The Minnesota Arctic Blast were a professional roller hockey team based in Minneapolis, Minnesota, United States that played in the Central Division of the Eastern Conference of the Roller Hockey International League.

The team's home arena was the Target Center.

See also
Minnesota Blue Ox

References

External links 
 Official website

 
Roller Hockey International teams
Sports clubs established in 1994
Sports in Minneapolis